Mark of the Devil (lit. Witches Tortured till They Bleed) is a 1970 West German horror film. It is most remembered for US marketing slogans devised by Hallmark Releasing Corp. that included "Positively the most horrifying film ever made" and "Rated V for Violence", while sick bags were given free to the audience upon admission.

While not prosecuted for obscenity, the film was seized and confiscated in the UK under Section 3 of the Obscene Publications Act 1959 during the video nasty panic.

Plot

Count Christian von Meruh (Udo Kier) is a witch hunter and apprentice to Lord Cumberland (Herbert Lom) in early 18th-century Austria. He believes strongly in his mentor and his mission but loses faith when he catches Cumberland strangling a man to death for calling him impotent. Meruh begins to see for himself that the witch trials are a scam to rob people of their land, money, and other personal belongings of value and seduce beautiful women. Eventually, the townspeople revolt, and Cumberland escapes but Meruh is captured by the townspeople.

The film (which The Aurum Film Encyclopedia: Horror calls "grotesquely sadistic") contains very strong simulations of graphic torture including a woman's tongue being ripped out of her head by tongue pincers, nuns being raped, nails to probe for the Devil's spot, whipping posts, fingers being cut off, racks and multitudes of vicious beatings.

The opening credits and voiceover make the exaggerated claim that over eight million people were condemned as witches and killed during the period in which the film is set. The scholarly consensus on the total number of executions for witchcraft ranges from 40,000–60,000.

Cast
 Herbert Lom - Lord Cumberland 
 Olivera Katarina - Vanessa Benedikt (credited as Olivera Vučo) 
 Udo Kier - Count Christian von Meruh 
 Reggie Nalder - Albino 
 Herbert Fux - Executioner 
 Michael Maien - Baron Daumer 
 Ingeborg Schöner - Nobleman's Wife 
 Johannes Buzalski - Advocate 
 Gaby Fuchs - Deidre von Bergenstein 
 Adrian Hoven - Nobleman

Production
The film is based upon Michael Armstrong's 1969 script. The original plans were led by producer Adrian Hoven, who intended to produce, direct and star in the film. Hoven's version was a completely different film rumoured to have been called The Witch Hunter - Dr. Dracula. The film was made to cash in on the success of Michael Reeves' 1968 classic Witchfinder General. Hoven has been a collaborator of Jess Franco. He was an actor turned producer and director.

The production was filmed during the summer of 1969 in Austria. From the beginning production was difficult, including that at least half a dozen languages were spoken on set, which caused problems for the cast and crew. Producer Adrian Hoven and director Michael Armstrong disliked each other intensely and often argued over the slightest of things. Hoven made sure a small number of the scripts were kept on set and even cut some of Armstrong's footage, so his own ideas could be inserted in the film. Because cinematographer Ernst W. Kalinke was a friend of Hoven's, they would both film scenes without Armstrong's permission. It has been debated  how much of Mark of the Devil was filmed by Armstrong and what by Hoven. Armstrong claims in his commentary track on the blu-ray release by Arrow that they filmed nothing significant, although he did add the water torture scene featuring Hoven as an actor at his request. To give the film some historical accuracy, it was filmed in an Austrian castle where actual witchfinding interrogations had taken place. This castle also served as a museum with authentic torture tools that were used in the film.

Release
Mark of the Devil was released theatrically in West Germany on February 19, 1970.

The film was released theatrically in the United States by Hallmark Releasing in 1972 and has been available since then on VHS in a multitude of releases from different companies, all varying in terms of the violent content, and released on laserdisc by Elite Entertainment. The film was released on DVD by Anchor Bay Entertainment in 1998 and re-released by Blue Underground in 2004, with this release being deemed the most complete version of the film. Arrow Films released the film on March 17, 2015 uncut for the first time on Blu-ray Disc in the United Kingdom and United States. The release featured the High Rising Productions documentary film Mark of the Times and a special featurette over the distributor Hallmark Releasing with the documentary Hallmark of the Devil. The film is rated 18 by the British Board of Film Classification.

Reception

The film was more successful at the box office than Witchfinder General. This success is often attributed to the advertising campaign. The film has been criticized by many reviewers for being too violent to contain any message and far too exploitative whilst dealing with a serious historical subject. Other reviews praise the film for its soundtrack, special effects, and filming locations, consisting of the mountainous Austrian countryside and stately castles.

The University of Vienna's film studies conference "Mark of the Devil: On a Classic Exploitation Film" was held on 3–5 April 2014. In 2017 the Cine-Excess eJournal devoted a special issue to the film and its sequel, Mark of the Devil Part II, which includes a range of extensive articles (about topics such as authorship, marketing and censorship) and an interview with Joyce and Percy Hoven.

"Mark of the Devil", a track on Finnish heavy/doom metal band Wolfshead's 2015 EP Caput Lupinum, is based on the film.

Sequel

Producer Hoven delivered the official sequel, Mark of the Devil Part II (German: Hexen geschändet und zu Tode gequält) in 1973. In addition, several VHS companies sought to exploit the title's notoriety by retitling several unrelated European horror films as sequels. This included Mark of the Devil - Part III which was the 1975 Mexican film Sisters of Satan (a.k.a. Alucarda). Mark of the Devil - Part IV and Mark of the Devil - Part V (which featured scream queen Michelle Bauer on the box art even though she did not appear in the movie) were films from the popular Blind Dead series. Two low-budget sequels were the American-made Mark of the Devil 666: The Moralist (1995) released on VHS by Moore Video, and the more comically/horror-spoof toned Mark of the Devil 777: The Moralist, Part 2. The two later films are directly connected with storyline and characters.

References

External links
 
 
 
 Mark of the Devil: On a Classic Exploitation Film. An International Conference
 Mark of the Devil: International Perspectives on a Cult Classic. Special issue of the Cine-Excess eJournal 

1970 films
1970 horror films
Films about witchcraft
Films directed by Michael Armstrong
Films set in Austria
Films set in the 1700s
Films shot in Austria
1970s German-language films
German horror films
Obscenity controversies in film
German splatter films
Folk horror films
West German films
Witch hunting in fiction
Video nasties
1970s German films